Chloe Primerano (born January 2, 2007) is a Canadian junior ice hockey defenceman and prospect to the Vancouver Giants of the Western Hockey League (WHL). She was the first female skater to be selected in the Canadian Hockey League Prospects Draft.

Early life 
Primerano was born on January 2, 2007, in North Vancouver, to parents Joe and Fiona Primerano. She began playing ice hockey around the age of two or three, and would frequently play against male opponents. She played minor ice hockey with the Burnaby Winter Club U15 program, where during the 2021–22 season she scored two goals and 19 points in 30 regular-season games. In the postseason, she added two assists in three playoff games.

Playing career 
On May 19, 2022, the Vancouver Giants of the Western Hockey League (WHL) selected Primerano in the 13th round, 268th overall, of the WHL Prospects Draft. While there have previously been female goaltenders in the Canadian Hockey League (CHL), Primerano is the first female skater to be drafted by a CHL team. Scouts for the Giants would attend Primeranto's U15 games with Burnaby, prompting general manager Barclay Parneta to select her in the draft.

As a 15-year-old draft pick, Primerano is eligible to play a few games for the Giants during the 2022–23 WHL season before joining them in full for the 2023–24 season. For the majority of the 2022–23 season, she is committed to play for the Rink Academy in Kelowna, British Columbia.

Personal life 
Primerano's older brother Luca is also an ice hockey player. In 2022, he joined the Prince George Spruce Kings of the British Columbia Hockey League. As of 2022, both Chloe and Luca attend Burnaby Central Secondary School, where in addition to hockey, Chloe plays basketball and soccer.

References

External links 
 

2007 births
Living people
Canadian women's ice hockey defencemen
Ice hockey people from British Columbia
People from North Vancouver